Ruston Rials Webster (born September 30, 1962) is an American football scout for the Atlanta Falcons of the National Football League (NFL). He previously served as general manager of the Tennessee Titans. During his time with the Seattle Seahawks, Webster also served as the vice president of player personnel under general manager Tim Ruskell. His career began with the Tampa Bay Buccaneers, where he started as a scout.
 
He is a graduate of the University of Mississippi, and he and his wife, Gayle, have three children, a daughter, Hannah, and two sons, Jacob, and Drew. Ruston was born in Houston, Texas to Philip and Patricia Webster, while he was raised in Madison, Mississippi.

References

1962 births
Living people
Seattle Seahawks executives
Tampa Bay Buccaneers executives
Tampa Bay Buccaneers scouts
Tennessee Titans executives
National Football League general managers
University of Mississippi alumni
People from Madison, Mississippi